The 1908 Arkansas Razorbacks football team represented the University of Arkansas during the 1908 college football season. The Razorbacks compiled a 5–4 record and outscored their opponents by a combined total of 213 to 120. In February 1908, Arkansas hired Hugo Bezdek, who had played at the fullback position for Amos Alonzo Stagg's Chicago Maroons football teams, as athletic director and football coach. The 1908 season was Bezdek's first at the helm of the Arkansas team.

Schedule

References

Arkansas
Arkansas Razorbacks football seasons
Arkansas Razorbacks football